Paul Annacone and Christo van Rensburg were the defending champions however they lost in the first round to Brad Gilbert and Vince Van Patten.

Gilbert and Van Patten won the final on a walkover against Stefan Edberg and Anders Järryd.

Seeds

Draw

Finals

Top half

Section 1

Section 2

Bottom half

Section 3

Section 4

External links
1986 Lipton International Players Championships Doubles Draw

Men's Doubles